EUMEL (pronounced oimel for Extendable Multi User Microprocessor ELAN System and also known as L2 for Liedtke 2) is an operating system (OS) which began as a runtime system (environment) for the programming language ELAN. It was created in 1979 by Jochen Liedtke at the Bielefeld University. EUMEL initially ran on the 8-bit Zilog Z80 processor. It later was ported to many different computer architectures.

More than 2000 Eumel systems shipped, mostly to schools and also to legal practices as a text processing platform.

EUMEL is based on a virtual machine using a bitcode and achieves remarkable performance and function. Z80-based EUMEL systems provide full multi-user multi-tasking operation with virtual memory management and complete isolation of one process against all others. These systems usually execute ELAN programs faster than equivalent programs written in languages such as COBOL, BASIC, or Pascal, and compiled into Z80 machine code on other operating systems.

One of the main features of EUMEL is that it is persistent, using a fixpoint/restart logic. This means that if the OS crashes, or the power fails, a user loses only a few minutes of work: on restart they continue working from the prior fixpoint with all program state intact fully. This is also termed orthogonal persistence. 

EUMEL was followed by the L3 microkernel, and later the L4 microkernel family.

References

Discontinued operating systems
Microkernels